Armando Rodríguez may refer to:

 Armando Rodríguez (journalist) (c. 1968–2008), murdered Mexican journalist who covered crime for El Diario de Juárez
 Armando Rodríguez-González (1889–1965), Cuban composer and musician
 Armando Rodriguez (businessman) (1918–2014), Cuban-American entrepreneur who was one of the first Cuban rafters